Clarence "Motts" Thomas (October 17, 1945 – February 20, 2011) was an American football coach.  He served as the head football coach at Bowie State University from 1974 to 1975, Morgan State University from 1978 to 1980, and at Pomona-Pitzer in Claremont, California from 1982 to 1993, compiling a career college football coaching record of 52–96–3.

Thomas played college football at Morgan State as a center and linebacker for head coach Earl Banks.  He was an assistant at Morgan State in 1972 under Banks, coaching the defensive line.  In 1973, Thomas was the appointed the head football coach at Montgomery Blair High School in Silver Spring, Maryland, becoming the first African-American head football coach in Montgomery County.

Head coaching record

College

Notes

References

1945 births
2011 deaths
American football centers
American football linebackers
Bowie State Bulldogs football coaches
Morgan State Bears football coaches
Morgan State Bears football players
Pomona-Pitzer Sagehens football coaches
Williams Ephs football coaches
High school football coaches in Maryland
High school wrestling coaches in the United States
African-American coaches of American football
African-American players of American football
20th-century African-American sportspeople
21st-century African-American sportspeople